Edward Jack Butcher (28 October 1914 – 26 February 1978) was a player for Geelong and South Melbourne in the VFL between 1938 and 1945. He was a left-footer who could play in many different positions, but played his best football at half-back.

Butcher played several seasons for Geelong and, when Geelong were forced into recess due to World War II, he crossed to South Melbourne. After Geelong rejoined the league, Butcher returned and captained the club in 1944 and 1945. He retired during the 1945 season.

References

External links

1914 births
1978 deaths
Geelong Football Club players
Sydney Swans players
Australian rules footballers from Victoria (Australia)